Graham Sykes (20 July 1937 – 26 November 2008) was an English competitive swimmer.

Swimming career
Born in Coventry, he represented Great Britain in the 1956 Summer Olympics and 1960 Summer Olympics.

He represented England and won a bronze medal in the medley relay at the 1958 British Empire and Commonwealth Games in Cardiff, Wales. Four years later he won a gold medal in the 110 yards backstroke and a silver medal in the medley relay at the 1962 British Empire and Commonwealth Games in Perth, Western Australia. At the ASA National British Championships he won the 110 yards backstroke title five times (1956, 1957, 1958, 1959, 1960).

See also
 List of Commonwealth Games medallists in swimming (men)

References

1937 births
2008 deaths
Sportspeople from Coventry
English male swimmers
Male backstroke swimmers
Olympic swimmers of Great Britain
Swimmers at the 1956 Summer Olympics
Swimmers at the 1960 Summer Olympics
Swimmers at the 1958 British Empire and Commonwealth Games
Swimmers at the 1962 British Empire and Commonwealth Games
Commonwealth Games medallists in swimming
Commonwealth Games gold medallists for England
Commonwealth Games silver medallists for England
Commonwealth Games bronze medallists for England
Medallists at the 1958 British Empire and Commonwealth Games
Medallists at the 1962 British Empire and Commonwealth Games